Carmody is an unincorporated community in Dalbo Township, Isanti County, Minnesota, United States.

Isanti County Roads 13, 15, and 62 are three of the main routes in the community.  Nearby places include Dalbo, Wyanett, and Princeton.

Infrastructure

Transportation
  Isanti County Road 13
  Isanti County Road 15
  Isanti County Road 62

References

 Official State of Minnesota Highway Map – 2013/2014 edition

Unincorporated communities in Minnesota
Unincorporated communities in Isanti County, Minnesota